Elizabeth Kaitan sometimes credited as Elizabeth Cayton (born July 19, 1960) is a Hungarian-American actress and model.

Career
Elizabeth Kaitan was a model for the Bonnie Kay Agency in New York City in the early 1980s.

Kaitan is perhaps best known for her roles in movies such as Savage Dawn (1985), Silent Night, Deadly Night Part 2 (1987) as Jennifer, Friday the 13th Part VII: The New Blood (1988) as Robin, and in Vice Academy parts 3, 4, 5, and 6 as Candy, and in the cult movie Beretta's Island (1994) as Linda. She made her final film appearance in 1999.

In 2009 she appeared in three Friday the 13th related documentaries as herself: "His Name Was Jason: 30 Years of Friday the 13th", "Makeover by Maddy: Need a Little Touch-Up Work My Ass" & "Jason's Destroyer: The Making of Friday the 13th Part VII - The New Blood". In 2013 she appeared in another Friday the 13th documentary: "Crystal Lake Memories: The Complete History of Friday the 13th".

Filmography

Film

Television
 Trackdown: Finding the Goodbar Killer (1983, TV movie)
 Encyclopedia Brown (1990, TV series – 1 episode)
 Love Street (1994, TV series – 1 episode)

Documentaries
 Invasion of the Scream Queens (1992) 
 Makeover by Maddy: Need a Little Touch-Up Work My Ass (2009)
 Jason's Destroyer: The Making of Friday the 13th Part VII - The New Blood (2009)
 Crystal Lake Memories: The Complete History of Friday the 13th (2013)
 Slay Bells Ring Again: The Story of Silent Night, Deadly Night 2 (2018)

References

External links

 Where are they now?

1960 births
American film actresses
American female models
Living people
Hungarian emigrants to the United States
21st-century American women